Jean Joseph Eleonora Antoine Ansiaux (1764–1840)  was a Belgian-born historical and portrait painter who worked in France.

Life

Ansiaux, a pupil of François-André Vincent, was born in Liège, Belgium, in 1764.

His elder brother, Emmanuel Antoine Joseph Ansiaux (1761-1800), worked in politics and law, a pathway the younger Ansiaux was to have taken before turning to art.

His works, taken from sacred and profane history, and poetical subjects, are numerous, and place him among the best artists of the French school in the 19th century. He also painted portraits of several distinguished persons, ministers, and generals of Napoleon I.

He was known for working in the Romantic-inspired Troubadour style of French historical painting. The Grove Dictionary of Art criticized his works done in this style, calling them "very uneven" and "often laborious."

Death
Ansiaux died in Paris in 1840.

Works
His works include:
Angers. Cathedral: Raising of the Cross, 1827.
Arras. Cathedral: Resurrection
Bordeaux. Museum: Richelieu presenting Poussin to Louis XIII, 1817.
Le Mans. Cathedral: Adoration of the Kings.
Liège Cathedral: Ascension, 1812 and Conversion of St. Paul, 1814.
Liège, Hôtel-de-Ville: Return of the Prodigal Son, 1819.
Lille. Museum: St. John rebuking Herod, 1822 and finding of Moses, 1822.
Metz. Cathedral: The Flagellation.
Paris, S. Etienne-du-Mont: St. Paul preaching at Athens.

Gallery

References

 

1764 births
1840 deaths
Artists from Liège
Burials at Père Lachaise Cemetery
18th-century French painters
French male painters
19th-century French painters
19th-century French male artists
18th-century French male artists